Aden Abdullahi Nur, also known as Aadan Gabyow was Somali politician and a military general in the Somali National Army. He served as Minister of Defence under President Siad Barre from 1986 to 1988.

Early years

Aden Abdullahi Nur was born in Mado Gashi, North Eastern Province Kenya. He joined the King's African Rifles in 1947 and undertook his military training in the second capital city of Uganda, Jinja. He finished training the same year and was transferred to Jigjiga, Somali Region Ethiopia.

When he finished duty in Jigjiga, he was sent to Kismayo only to be sent back to Kenya when the British handed the territory over to Italy. Gabyow was among British troops who were sent to fight in Korea until 1952. He had previously fought in the Malayan Emergency. In 1952 he was sent to Britain and was among the African troops sent to Britain to attend the coronation Queen Elizabeth II.

Career

In 1963, Gabyow became a platoon leader in the new Kenyan army but was reduced to a private forcing him to leave the army. In 1970 he made his way to Dar es Salaam, Tanzania from where he was transported to Mogadishu by the Somali embassy. Because of his experience fighting communists in Asia, he was sent to the Soviet Union for four years' training.  He became head of a new police station and was later appointed head of Halane military training station in 1976. He was promoted to the rank of colonel the same year.

After being the head of Halane military training station, General Adan Gabyow became Minister of Defence under Siad Barre. As a result of a conflict between him and Barre he was arrested and jailed in 1988.

Foreign and Commonwealth Office files at Kew attest that Gen Aden Abdullahi Nur was relieved as Minister of Defence and appointed Minister of Tourism on 30 January 1989.

Somali Patriotic Movement (SPM)

Somali Patriotic Movement was formed in 1985 as a result of a split in the Somali Salvation Democratic Front by military dissidents hailing from Gabyow's own Ogaden. In 1988 they demanded the release of General Gabyow and encouraged officers from their Ogaden clan to resign. Their appeal led to the desertation of Colonel Ahmed Omar Jess. The sacking of Gabyow was the catalyst for a conflict that had been smouldering over a number of years. In March 1989 soldiers of the Ogaden mutinied in Kismayo, and fighting continued until the government troops gained the upper hand in July.

Civil War

In January 1991, the government of Siad Barre was toppled in Mogadishu by the Hawiye-dominated United Somali Congress. In February 1991 fighting erupted between the USC and the SPM in Afgoye. The defeated SPM were forced to flee south to Kismayo, where they joined up with other disparate Darod who had fled from Mogadishu. In April the same year, SPM lost control of the port city of Kismayo and the USC finally captured Kismayo at the end of the month, and the SPM/SNF were pushed south of Dhobley.

Gabyow was finally released from prison when the USC overran the capital. Following the defeat of SPM, various Darod factions, including the SPM, SSDF and SNF regrouped under the banner of SPM. Gabyow was appointed the new chairman of SPM, taking over from Colonel Biliqo and Jess became the military commander. General Morgan was given charge of the police. The SPM recaptured Kismayo and Brava in June 1991.

Following their defeat the various Darod factions, including the SPM (Ogaden), SSDF (Harti) and SNF (Marehan), regrouped under the banner of the SPM. Internal Darod conflicts over land were forgotten in the face of the anti-Darod rhetoric from Aideed, who proclaimed his intention of clearing all Darod from Somalia. Gabiyo was appointed the new chairman of the SPM, and Jess the military commander. General Morgan (Majeerteen and Barre's son-in-law) was given charge of the police. The election of Gabiyo as the Chairman led to a rift between Gabiyo and Jess. It is suggested that Gabiyo was elected chairman to ensure the support of his Awlihan clan, who up until then had been supporting Jess.

In June 1991, the SPM recaptured Kismayo and Brava. A second attempt to retake Mogadishu was again defeated by the USC. In December 1991, during the reelection of the SPM chairman, Gabiyo and Morgan combined forces to remove Jess's forces from Kismayo and Brava. Jess then went on to form an alliance with Aideed's USC, which became known as the Somali Liberation Army (SLA). Their combined forces managed to push Gabiyo and Morgan out of Kismayo and in April 1992 forced Barre into exile in Kenya. Following this victory Aideed and Jess formed the Somali National Alliance (SNA), combining together with the SDM and the SSNM.

In December 1991, during the reelection of the SPM chairman, Gabyow combined forces with Morgan who led SSDF/SPM to remove Jess' forces from Kismayo and Brava. Jess then formed an alliance with General Mohamed Farrah Aideed's USC. Their combined forces managed to push Gabyow and Morgan out of Kismayo, rendering Siad Barre to exile.  As a result of a US-led UN sanctioned intervention in Somalia, Unified Task Force (UNITAF) took control of Kismayo. When the forces withdrew the city once again remained under control of an alliance of SPM/SSDF/SNF forces.

Cairo Peace Conference

General Gabyow was among 25 delegates attending the Cairo Peace Conference in 1998. Colonel Abdullahi Yusuf Ahmed and Gabyow stormed out of the Cairo talks and later announced their rejection of the Cairo declaration. Gabyow had long pointed an accusing finger at Hussein Aideed, son of Aideed who took over his father's position after he was killed in fighting between him and Ali Mahdi, and the Egyptian government for instigating violence in Kismayo, but both the Egyptian authorities and Aidid denied any involvement in the war-torn southern Somali port.

Both General Morgan and Gabyow belong to the powerful Darod clan which felt marginalised by the political dominance of the Hawiye due to the legitimacy the Cairo declaration gave Somalia's two most powerful Hawiye - Hussein Farrah Aideed and Ali Mahdi Muhammad. The Cairo declaration subsequently failed after signatories including Aideed's failure to disarm.

In 2000, Gabyow was among several leaders calling for a federal system in Somalia.

Death

On June 5, 2002, General Aden Gabyow died in a Nairobi hospital after contracting stroke disease. He was one of several candidates running for presidency in the upcoming Transitional Federal Government.

See also

Abdullahi Yusuf Ahmed
Hasan Muhammad Nur Shatigadud

References

2002 deaths
Year of birth missing
Defence Ministers of Somalia
Ethnic Somali people
Somali Revolutionary Socialist Party politicians
Somalian military leaders
Somalian generals
People from Eastern Province (Kenya)
Government ministers of Somalia